Francolini is an Italian surname. Notable people with the surname include:

 Anna Francolini (born 1973), British actress
 Balthazar Francolini (1650–1709), Italian Jesuit theologian
 David Francolini (born 1969), British drummer
 Francesca Francolini (born 1979), Italian softball player

Italian-language surnames